Oak Hall may refer to:

in Canada
Oak Hall (Niagara Falls, Ontario), a mansion

in the United States
Oak Hall (Bunkie, Louisiana), listed on the National Register of Historic Places (NRHP)
Oak Hall (Columbia, Maryland), a historic slave plantation
Oak Hall, Kansas City, Missouri, residence of William Rockhill Nelson
Oak Hall (Urbana College), Urbana, Ohio
Oak Hall (Brentwood, Tennessee), listed on the NRHP
Oak Hall School, a preparatory school in Gainesville, Florida
Oak Hall (Northport, Maine), also known as Cobe Estate, listed on the National Register of Historic Places (NRHP)